Panjiayuan may refer to:

 Panjiayuan Subdistrict, Chaoyang, Beijing
 Panjiayuan Station on line 10 of the Beijing Subway
 Beijing Antique Market, Chaoyang, Beijing